Sanchakou may refer to:

Sanchakou, a traditional Chinese opera based on an episode from the Generals of the Yang Family saga
Divergence (film), a 2005 Hong Kong film with this Chinese title

Places in China
Sanchakou, Heilongjiang, a town in Dongning, Heilongjiang
Sanchakou Township, a township in Qahar Right Front Banner, Inner Mongolia
Achal, also known as Sanchakou, a town in Maralbexi County, Xinjiang